The Scottish Hard Court Championships its original name also called Scottish Hard Championships was a tennis event held from 1923 through 1994 in Scotland.

History
The Scottish Hard Court Championships was first played at the St Andrews Lawn Tennis Club, Kinburn Park St Andrews, Fife, Scotland on outdoor clay courts in 1923 and remained there until 1981  when it changed location to Fort Hill Tennis Club, Broughty Ferry, Dundee for the remainder of its run. The tournament featured both men's and women's singles competition as well as same sex and mixed doubles the tournament survived for a period of 71 years until 1994.

Champions

Men's singles

Women's singles

Notes

References
 Ayre's Lawn Tennis Almanack And Tournament Guide, A. Wallis Myers. UK.
 Dunlop Lawn Tennis Almanack and Tournament Guide, G.P. Hughes, 1939 to 1958, Published by Dunlop Sports Co. Ltd, UK.
 Lawn Tennis and Badminton Magazines, 1896–1901, Amateur Sports Publishing Co. Ltd, London, UK.
 Lawn Tennis and Croquet Magazines, 1901–1920, Amateur Sports Publishing Co. Ltd, London, UK.
 Lowe's Lawn Tennis Annuals and Compendia, Lowe, Sir F. Gordon, Eyre & Spottiswoode, London, UK.

See also
Tennis in Scotland

External links
https://app.thetennisbase.com/Scottish Hard Court Championships Roll of Honour
Scottish Hard Courts

Defunct tennis tournaments in the United Kingdom
Clay court tennis tournaments
Tennis tournaments in Scotland
1923 establishments in Scotland
1994 disestablishments in Scotland
Recurring sporting events established in 1923
Recurring sporting events disestablished in 1994
Sport in Fife
Sports competitions in Dundee